Joanderson de Jesus Assis (born 16 February 1996) is a Brazilian professional footballer who plays as a forward.

Club career
Born in Jequié, Joanderson joined the youth setup of São Paulo FC in 2009. He scored seven goals during the 2013 Copa do Brasil under-17, and became the cup's top-scorer. Amidst interest from other national and international clubs, he was promoted to the senior team on 22 April 2015 and signed a contract until 2019.

On 18 April 2016, Joanderson was loaned out to Cruzeiro in loan deal, which saw Tom moving in the opposite direction. On 22 February 2017, he was loaned out to Internacional for the upcoming season.

Joanderson joined Atlético Goianiense on loan for the upcoming season on 16 February 2018. On 13 July, he moved to Criciúma on loan.

After a year with Grêmio's B/U23 team, Joanderson moved to Japanese club Gainare Tottori on 24 January 2020.

International career
Joanderson has been capped by Brazil at under-17 level, representing the side at 2013 Under-17 World Cup and scored a goal against UAE in the tournament.

Career statistics

References

External links

1996 births
Living people
Association football forwards
Brazilian footballers
Brazilian expatriate footballers
Campeonato Brasileiro Série A players
Campeonato Brasileiro Série B players
J3 League players
Liga 1 (Indonesia) players
São Paulo FC players
Cruzeiro Esporte Clube players
Sport Club Internacional players
Atlético Clube Goianiense players
Criciúma Esporte Clube players
Grêmio Foot-Ball Porto Alegrense players
Gainare Tottori players
Sampaio Corrêa Futebol Clube players
Esporte Clube Passo Fundo players
Persik Kediri players
Brazilian expatriate sportspeople in Japan
Expatriate footballers in Japan
Brazilian expatriate sportspeople in Indonesia
Expatriate footballers in Indonesia